Klaus Rajewsky (born 12 November 1936 in Frankfurt am Main) is a German immunologist, renowned for his work on B cells.

He studied medicine in Frankfurt, Munich and at the Pasteur Institute, Paris. In 1964 he started working at the Institute of Genetics in the University of Cologne, where he became professor for genetics. He researched Hodgkin's disease and the role of B cells within the immune system. He also developed conditional knockout mice based on Cre-Lox recombination.

He is one of the founding fathers of the German society for immunology (1967).
Since 1994 he has been a member of the United States National Academy of Sciences.
From 1995 to 2001 he was head of the Monterotondo station of the European Molecular Biology Laboratory near Rome.
In 1996 he was awarded the Robert Koch Prize (shared with Fritz Melchers).
In 1998 he founded Artemis Pharmaceuticals, together with Christiane Nüsslein-Volhard and Peter Stadler.

In 2001 he started working at the Center for Blood Research at Harvard Medical School, Boston, where an additional focus of his work concerns RNAi, especially microRNAs, in conjunction with immune development and control. Since start of 2012 he works at MDC Berlin.

Klaus Rajewsky is a son of the noted biophysicist Boris Rajewsky, and the father of the renowned systems biologist Nikolaus Rajewsky.

Awards 
 1977 Avery-Landsteiner Prize of the German society for immunology
 1994 Behring Kitasato Prize from the Hoechst Japan
 1996 Robert Koch Prize, together with Fritz Melchers
 1997 Körber European Science Prize, together with Pawel Kisielow and Harald von Boehmer
 2001 Deutscher Krebshilfepreis, together with Martin-Leo Hansmann and Ralf Küppers
 2004 Honorary degree of the Johann Wolfgang Goethe University of Frankfurt am Main
 2005 Charles Rodolphe Brupbacher Prize for Cancer Research, together with Mariano Barbacid
 2007 Novartis Prize for Basic Immunology, together with Frederick Alt and 
 2008 Ernst Schering Prize
 2009 Max Delbrück Medal
 2009 William B. Coley Award for Distinguished Research in Tumor Immunology, together with Frederick Alt
 2010 Ernst Jung Gold Medal for Medicine
 2022 Mendel Medal by the Masaryk University

References

External links 

 
 

1936 births
Living people
German immunologists
Foreign associates of the National Academy of Sciences
Foreign Members of the Russian Academy of Sciences